Samuel Levinson (born January 8, 1985) is an American filmmaker and actor. He is the son of Academy Award-winning director Barry Levinson. In 2010, he received his first writing credit as a co-writer for the action comedy film Operation: Endgame. The following year, he made his directorial film debut with Another Happy Day (2011), which premiered at Sundance Film Festival. He then received a writing credit on his father's HBO television film The Wizard of Lies (2017). He continued writing and directing for the feature films Assassination Nation (2018) and Malcolm & Marie (2021). 

In 2019, Levinson created the HBO teen drama series Euphoria which was adapted from the Israeli series of the same name. The series has become popular with audiences, while garnering significant criticism and controversy for its explicit content involving teens, particularly its portrayal of teenage sexuality. Levinson was nominated for a BAFTA TV Award and two Primetime Emmy Awards for the series.

Early life
Levinson was born on January 8, 1985, and is the son of Diana Rhodes, a production designer for TV commercials, and filmmaker Barry Levinson. His father is from a Russian-Jewish family. Levinson studied method acting for four years. He has a brother, Jack Levinson, who is also an actor, and two half-siblings, Michelle and Patrick, from his mother's first marriage.

Career
Levinson made his film debut as an actor in the 1992 fantasy comedy Toys, alongside his brother Jack. He later appeared in the comedy-drama film Bandits (2001) and the satirical comedy film What Just Happened (2008). In 2009, he co-starred as Peter Thompson in the arthouse drama film Stoic. In 2011, Levinson won the Waldo Salt Screenwriting Award at the Sundance Film Festival for his directorial debut film, Another Happy Day, which starred Ellen Barkin.

Levinson co-wrote the 2017 television film The Wizard of Lies, which was directed by his father Barry Levinson. The film focuses on Bernie Madoff, who is played by Robert De Niro. Levinson wrote and directed the film Assassination Nation which premiered at the 2018 Sundance Film Festival to mixed reviews from critics, who praised its "frenetic and visually stylish" action but criticized the thinly-written characters. In June 2019, Levinson created the HBO television drama series Euphoria, based on the Israeli series of the same name (Hebrew: אופוריה‎). The series has received both praise and criticism for its direction, writing, and acting. It is infamous for its raw and graphic portrayal of teenagers wrestling with drug addiction and sexuality.

In 2020, Levinson wrote and directed the film Malcolm & Marie, reuniting him with Euphoria star Zendaya. The film was distributed by Netflix in February 2021. He also executive produced the drama film Pieces of a Woman. Levinson co-wrote the screenplay for the psychological erotic thriller Deep Water (2022), based on the 1957 novel of the same name by Patricia Highsmith. On June 29, 2021, Levinson announced that he will be co-creating, writing and executive producing another HBO television drama series The Idol, alongside recording artist Abel 'The Weeknd' Tesfaye and his producing partner Reza Fahim.

Personal life
From 2008 to 2011, Levinson dated actress Ellen Barkin. Levinson is married to Ashley Lent Levinson. The couple has a son.

Levinson has discussed his struggles with drugs as a teenager and young adult.

Filmography

Film

Executive producer
 Pieces of a Woman (2020)
 X (2022)
 Breaking (2022)
 Pearl (2022)

Acting roles

Television

Accolades

References

External links

1985 births
20th-century American male actors
21st-century American male actors
American film directors
American male film actors
American male screenwriters
American people of Russian-Jewish descent
Jewish American male actors
Living people
Showrunners